Nipponoserica peregrina is a species of scarab beetle in the family Scarabaeidae. It is found in North America and Southern Asia.

References

Further reading

External links

 

Melolonthinae
Articles created by Qbugbot
Beetles described in 1938